Dagsland is a Norwegian surname. Notable people with the surname include:

Helga Dagsland (1910–2003), Norwegian nurse and organizational leader
Sigvart Dagsland (born 1963), Norwegian singer, pianist, and composer
Sturle Dagsland, Norwegian singer

Norwegian-language surnames